Sir Bernhard Samuelson, 1st Baronet,  (22 November 1820 – 10 May 1905) was an industrialist, educationalist and a Liberal politician who sat in the House of Commons in 1859 and from 1865 to 1895.

Early life
Samuelson was born in Hamburg, the eldest son of Samuel Hermann Samuelson and his wife Sarah Hertz. His father, who became a merchant in Liverpool, was born in Petersburg, Virginia, and his grandfather Hyman Samuels, was born in London in 1764. Samuelson was educated at the Rev. J Blezard's school at Skirlaugh, Yorkshire near Hull. He started work in his father's office at the age of 14 and was then apprenticed to a Swiss firm in Liverpool. He was exporting engineering machinery and became manager for a Manchester firm of Sharp, Stewart & Co.

Samuelson bought a small factory in Banbury that was manufacturing agricultural equipment in 1848. He also built blast furnaces in Middlesbrough and Newport.

Political career
In February 1859, after a by-election caused by the resignation of Henry William Tancred, Samuelson was elected as Member of Parliament for Banbury until displaced at the 1859 general election. In 1865 he was elected for Banbury again, but his defeated opponent Charles Bell petitioned against his return on the grounds that he was an alien. Samuelson was able to demonstrate that as his grandfather was born in England he was eligible under the British Nationality Act of 1772. He held the seat until 1895. His interests in Parliament were industrial and technical issues. He chaired committees on scientific instruction, railways and patents and was a member of the Royal Commission for the Paris Exhibition in 1878. Meanwhile, his industrial activities had grown significantly. By 1872, his Banbury works were producing over 8000 reaping machines and the production of iron, tar and other products from his ironworks had also grown.

Professional career
Samuelson was a member of the Institution of Civil Engineers and a member of the Institute of Mechanical Engineers. A paper on the construction of blast furnaces won him a Telford Medal in 1871. He was made a Fellow of the Royal Society in 1881.

He was adjudged a considerate employer and developed the institutions of Middlesbrough and Cleveland. He was a firm believer in technical education and presented a technical institute to Banbury in 1884.  He received a Baronetcy in the same year for services to education. He was made a privy counsellor in the 1895 Resignation Honours.

Personal life
Samuelson had married Caroline Blundell, daughter of Henry Blundell at Hull in 1844. They had eight children. Their eldest son Henry, who succeeded to the baronetcy, was also an MP. The baronetcy later passed to their second son, Francis. Their third and youngest son, Herbert, was made a KBE in his own right.

After Caroline's death, Bernhard married Lelia Mathilda, daughter of Chevalier Leon Serena and the widow of William Denny of Dumbarton. A volunteer nurse with the Voluntary Aid Detachments, she died of an illness contracted on duty on 18 June 1915.

Samuelson died in London in 1905 at the age of 84 and was buried in Torquay. 

A stone memorial and tomb to Bernhard Samuelson was erected by his eldest son: it lies hidden and overgrown in Hatchford Wood, close to Ockham, Surrey, and bears the motto of the second baronet. According to the inscription, this "Temple of Sleep" contains the last mortal remains of Bernhard Samuelson, his wife and a daughter. The mausoleum is now empty (August 2020) and various sculpture work appears to have been removed.

References

Oxford Dictionary of National Biography
Oxfordshire Blue Plaques
Nature 72, 60-61 (18 May 1905)

External links

1820 births
1905 deaths
English Jews
English industrialists
Liberal Party (UK) MPs for English constituencies
Members of the Privy Council of the United Kingdom
UK MPs 1857–1859
UK MPs 1865–1868
UK MPs 1868–1874
UK MPs 1874–1880
UK MPs 1880–1885
UK MPs 1885–1886
UK MPs 1886–1892
UK MPs 1892–1895
Baronets in the Baronetage of the United Kingdom
Fellows of the Royal Society
19th-century English businesspeople